Hüseyin Gürsoy (1934 – 1 September 1993) was a Turkish wrestler. He competed in the men's freestyle 87 kg at the 1968 Summer Olympics.

References

External links
 

1934 births
1993 deaths
Turkish male sport wrestlers
Olympic wrestlers of Turkey
Wrestlers at the 1968 Summer Olympics
People from Oltu
20th-century Turkish people